The 1910–11 season was the sixth in the history of the Isthmian League, an English football competition.

Clapton were champions, winning their first Isthmian League title. At the end of the season Bromley resigned from the league.

League table

References

Isthmian League seasons
I